The Ferdinand Fisher House is a historic house in Astoria, Oregon, listed on the National Register of Historic Places. It was completed circa 1883.

See also
 National Register of Historic Places listings in Clatsop County, Oregon

References

1883 establishments in Oregon
Houses on the National Register of Historic Places in Astoria, Oregon
Individually listed contributing properties to historic districts on the National Register in Oregon
Houses completed in 1883
Italianate architecture in Oregon